Elmer A. Stevens (January 15, 1862 – 1934) was an American politician who served as a member of the Massachusetts House of Representatives the Massachusetts State Senate, and as the Treasurer and Receiver-General of Massachusetts.

See also
 130th Massachusetts General Court (1909)

References

Bibliography
Who's Who in State Politics, 1912, Boston, Massachusetts: Practical Politics  (1912), p. 39.
Who's Who in State Politics, 1908, Boston, Massachusetts: Practical Politics, (1908), p. 81.

State treasurers of Massachusetts
Republican Party members of the Massachusetts House of Representatives
Republican Party Massachusetts state senators
1862 births
1932 deaths